In combustion, Liñán's flame speed provides the estimate of the upper limit for edge-flame propagation velocity, when the flame curvature is small. The formula is named after Amable Liñán. When the flame thickness is much smaller than the mixing-layer thickness through which the edge flame is propagating, a flame speed can be defined as the propagating speed of the flame front with respect to a region far ahead of the flame. For small flame curvatures (flame stretch), each point of the flame front propagates at a laminar planar premixed speed  that depends on a local equivalence ratio  just ahead of the flame. However, the flame front as a whole do not propagate at a speed  since the mixture ahead of the flame front undergoes thermal expansion due to the heating by the flame front, that aids the flame front to propagate faster with respect to the region far ahead from the flame front. Liñán estimated the edge flame speed to be:

Here  is the stoichiometric value of the planar speed. Due to the thermal expansion, streamlines diverges as it approaches the flame and a pressure builds just ahead of the flame.

References

Fluid dynamics
Combustion